Journey to a War is a travel book in prose and verse by W. H. Auden and Christopher Isherwood, published in 1939.

The book is in three parts: a series of poems by Auden describing his and Isherwood's journey to China in 1938 ; a "Travel-Diary" by Isherwood (including material first drafted by Auden) about their travels in China itself, and their observations of the Sino-Japanese War; and "In Time of War: A Sonnet Sequence with a Verse Commentary" by Auden, with reflections on the contemporary world and their experiences in China. The book also contains a selection of photographs by Auden.

Auden revised many of the poems in this book for his later collections; "In Time of War" was renamed "Sonnets from China" (with many original sonnets discarded) and the verse commentary was dropped entirely.

References
 W. H. Auden, Prose and Travel Books in Prose and Verse, 1927-1938, ed. Edward Mendelson (1997)
 John Fuller, W. H. Auden: A Commentary (1999).
 Edward Mendelson, Early Auden (1981).

External links
 The W. H. Auden Society

1939 books
Books by W. H. Auden
Works by Christopher Isherwood
Collaborative books
Poetry by W. H. Auden
Random House books